Homalium jainii is a species of plant in the family Salicaceae. It is endemic to Tamil Nadu in India.

References

jainii
Flora of Tamil Nadu
Endangered plants
Taxonomy articles created by Polbot